La Porte is a census-designated place (CDP) in Plumas County, California, United States. The population was 26 at the 2010 census, down from 43 at the 2000 census.

Geography
La Porte is located at  (39.681908, -120.984732).

Demographics

2010
At the 2010 census La Porte had a population of 26. The population density was 5.8 people per square mile (2.3/km2). The racial makeup of La Porte was 24 (92%) White, 1 (4%) African American, 1 (4%) Native American, 0 (0%) Asian, 0 (0%) Pacific Islander, 0 (0%) from other races, and 0 (0%) from two or more races.  Hispanic or Latino of any race were 0 people (0.0%).

The whole population lived in households, no one lived in non-institutionalized group quarters and no one was institutionalized.

There were 15 households, 3 (20%) had children under the age of 18 living in them, 7 (47%) were opposite-sex married couples living together, 1 (7%) had a female householder with no husband present, 0 (0%) had a male householder with no wife present.  There were 0 (0%) unmarried opposite-sex partnerships, and 0 (0%) same-sex married couples or partnerships. 7 households (47%) were one person and 3 (20%) had someone living alone who was 65 or older. The average household size was 1.7.  There were 8 families (53% of households); the average family size was 2.4.

The age distribution was 4 people (15%) under the age of 18, 0 people (0%) aged 18 to 24, 3 people (12%) aged 25 to 44, 13 people (50%) aged 45 to 64, and 6 people (23%) who were 65 or older.  The median age was 56 years. For every 100 females, there were 100.0 males.  For every 100 females age 18 and over, there were 100.0 males.

There were 145 housing units at an average density of 32.5 per square mile, of the occupied units 10 (67%) were owner-occupied and 5 (33%) were rented. The homeowner vacancy rate was 17%; the rental vacancy rate was 0%.  17 people (65% of the population) lived in owner-occupied housing units and 9 people (35%) lived in rental housing units.

2000
At the 2000 census there were 43 people, 28 households, and 12 families in the CDP. The population density was 9.6 people per square mile (3.7/km2). The racial makeup of the CDP was 95% White, 2% Native American, and 2% from two or more races. 0% of the population were Hispanic or Latino of any race.
Of the 28 households 4% had children under the age of 18 living with them, 39% were married couples living together, and 54% were non-families. 50% of households were one person and 25% were one person aged 65 or older. The average household size was 1.5 and the average family size was 2.1.

The age distribution was 5% under the age of 18, 2% from 18 to 24, 2% from 25 to 44, 54% from 45 to 64, and 37% 65 or older. The median age was 60 years. For every 100 females, there were 187 males. For every 100 females age 18 and over, there were 173 males.

The median household income was $30,781 and the median family income  was $11,250. Males had a median income of $12,083 versus $0 for females. The per capita income for the CDP was $18,258. There were 100% of families and 65% of the population living below the poverty line, including 100% of under eighteens and none of those over 64.

Little Grass Valley Reservoir

Completed in 1961, the nearby Little Grass Valley Reservoir is a popular summer water sports area.  Hiking, equestrian, and OHV trails surround the lake.

History
At the time of statehood in 1850, La Porte was located in Yuba County, one of California's 27 original counties.

In 1852, Sierra County was created from part of Yuba County. After that time, La Porte was located in Sierra County.

In 1854, Plumas County was created from part of Yuba County. In 1866, a further realignment placed La Porte in Plumas County, where it has remained ever since.

La Porte was named Rabbit Creek until 1857. It was a hub of commerce in the region during the California Gold Rush.

Politics

Howland Flat and Poker Flat

About  outside La Porte, via the Port Wine Ridge Road in adjacent Sierra County, lies the remains of the former gold mining town of Howland Flat.

Also on Port Wine Ridge Road, and southwest of Mount Fillmore, the ghost town of Grass Flat is located. It is the site of extensive gold rush hydraulic mining, with a dramatic and barren landscape still remaining.

The ghost town of Poker Flat is located on the Poker Flat OHV trail in the Plumas National Forest. The last-standing structure of Poker Flat, the 1886 Scott House, stood until the winter of 2014–15, when it collapsed.

Notable people 
Charlotte Ah Tye Chang (1873-1972), Chinese-American activist born in La Porte
Claire Cayot O'Rourke, supercentenarian and the first woman to hold public office in the state of California.

References

Census-designated places in Plumas County, California
Populated places in the Sierra Nevada (United States)